Damir Maretić (born 2 March 1969) is a Croatian retired football midfielder.

References

1969 births
Living people
Footballers from Split, Croatia
Association football midfielders
Croatian footballers
NK Zadar players
NK Belišće players
NK Varaždin players
Pogoń Szczecin players
NK Domžale players
Croatian Football League players
Ekstraklasa players
Slovenian PrvaLiga players
Croatian expatriate footballers
Expatriate footballers in Poland
Croatian expatriate sportspeople in Poland
Expatriate footballers in Slovenia
Croatian expatriate sportspeople in Slovenia